Purna Junction railway station is a main railway station in Parbhani district, Maharashtra. Its code is PAU. It serves Purna city. The station consists of four platforms. Purna has rail connectivity with Manmad, Aurangabad, Jalna, Nanded, Parbhani, Parli Vaijnath, Latur, Osmanabad, Gangakhed, Mudkhed, Adilabad, Nagpur, Basar, Nizamabad, Nasik, Mumbai, Delhi, Pune, Miraj, Daund, Mahbubnagar, Kurnool, Kadapa, Renigunta, Tirupati, Katpadi, Erode, Madurai and Kachiguda.,

Trains 

 Ajanta Express
 Kacheguda-Akola Intercity Express
 Pune–Amravati Express
 Hazur Sahib Nanded–Shri Ganganagar Weekly Express
 Lokmanya Tilak Terminus–Ajni Express
 Ajmer–Hyderabad Meenakshi Express
 Nizamabad–Lokmanya Tilak Terminus Express
 Narasapur–Nagarsol Express (via Warangal)
 Daund–Hazur Sahib Nanded Passenger
 Lokmanya Tilak Terminus–Hazur Sahib Nanded Express
 Nagpur–CSMT Kolhapur Express (via Usmanabad) 
 Sainagar Shirdi–Visakhapatnam Express
 Tirupati–Sainagar Shirdi Express
 Yesvantpur–Indore Weekly Express
 Sachkhand Express
 Tapovan Express
 Tirupati–Amravati Express
 Hazur Sahib Nanded–Una Himachal Express
 Patna–Purna Express

Originating trains 

 Akola–Purna Passenger
 Hyderabad–Purna Passenger
 Parli Vaijnath–Purna Passenger
 Purna–Adilabad Passenger
 Patna–Purna Express

References

Railway stations in Parbhani district